Alfred A. McKethan Stadium at Perry Field was the college baseball stadium of the University of Florida, serving as the home field for the Florida Gators baseball team until being replaced by Florida Ballpark in 2020.  McKethan Stadium was located on the university's Gainesville, Florida campus, in close proximity to the university's indoor sports arena, the Stephen C. O'Connell Center, and its football stadium, Ben Hill Griffin Stadium.

Namesakes 

The stadium facility was named for Alfred A. McKethan, a University of Florida alumnus and successful Florida banker, businessman, and politician who contributed significant funds for the reconstruction and expansion of the stadium.  McKethan donated the equivalent of $800,000 for the reconstruction and improvement of the stadium in the 1980s and 1990s.

The playing field was named for Carl E. "Tootie" Perry, a former Florida Gators football player who was the Gators' first All-Southern selection in 1920 and 1921 and team captain in 1921.  Perry's family formerly owned the land on which the baseball stadium was built, and donated the land to the university.

History 

In the earliest years of baseball at the University of Florida, club teams played at a field in downtown Gainesville's Porters Community. In 1911, the team moved on campus to Fleming Field, where the northern endzone of Ben Hill Griffin Stadium stands today. The varsity team was founded in 1912 and continued to play at Fleming Field through 1948. Eventually, an expansion to the football stadium forced the team to move 500 yards southwest to Perry Field.

Wanting to improve college baseball facilities in the state of Florida, New York Yankees owner George Steinbrenner provided funds for the university to install lights at Perry Field in 1977. Perry Field went on to host three exhibitions (in 1977, 1981, and 1987) where the Gators faced the Yankees. The most memorable of these was the March 23, 1977 contest, where an overflowing crowd of 3,820 saw the Gators mount a valiant effort in a 10-9 defeat.

Perry Field was further improved in 1981 with a $10,000 donation by former catcher Tom Shannon. A home team dugout, training room, and storage area were added to the facility. A notorious hill in left field, which rose 30 feet to the wall, proved an imposing obstacle to visiting outfielders.

Funded by Alfred McKethan, other athletic boosters, and the state government, a $2.4-million concrete stadium was constructed in 1987 to replace the existing bleachers at Perry Field for the 1988 season. The stadium was dedicated in McKethan's honor on February 23, 1988, before a 3-2 victory by the Gators over Miami. Initially seating 3,300 spectators (2,500 grandstand, 800 chairback), capacity was increased to 4,300 in the summer of 1995 with an expansion to the grandstand. A further $650,000 worth of renovations the following year improved the plaza surrounding the grandstand as well as the press box. New grass was installed in 1997 while 700 more seats were added along the left field line.

The final major renovation to McKethan Stadium came in 2006, when $13 million was spent to improve the stadium and the adjacent Lemerand Athletic Center. The project incorporated a new baseball-specific building, the roof of which became the Don and Irene Dizney Plaza, a location where fans could overlook the field from above the foul territory in left field. Additional seating was also built, including 400 bleacher seats in left field, increasing the capacity to 5,500. A high-resolution videoboard was added beyond right field in 2012.

The Gators finished 33 seasons at McKethan Stadium after hosting 1,214 games of baseball, with 911 victories to just 303 defeats (.750). The stadium also hosted the 1989 SEC Tournament, 16 NCAA Regionals, and nine NCAA Super Regionals.

Won by Florida in bold

Facilities 

The stadium facility was a concrete structure that seated approximately 5,500 fans, including 2,408 chairback seats around the inner diamond. The asymmetrical stadium seated about two-thirds of its spectators left of home plate. Outfield seating was limited to a section of bleachers in left field. Visible past left field was the O'Connell Center and Ben Hill Griffin Stadium behind it, while the view beyond right field was of the Graham Woods Conservation Area. The courtyard-like plaza surrounding the grandstand could host food trucks and merchandise stalls, while permanent concession facilities and restrooms were built under the grandstands themselves. A south entrance provided entry to the right field stands while a north entrance gave access to the left field stands (ticket booths were available at both entrances). Facilities included a training center, video room, staff offices, and locker rooms for both home and visiting teams. The Gators' bullpen and batting cages were enclosed, under the Dizney Plaza.

Attendance and records 

In 33 seasons of baseball, McKethan Stadium hosted over 3.2 million fans for Florida home games. Support was greatest in the ballpark's final 11 seasons, with an average of over 3,000 spectators per game each year. Ultimately, 61 contests drew a crowd of 5,000 or greater. Attendance at McKethan Stadium peaked in 2018, the year following Florida's first national championship campaign. That season, the Gators ranked ninth among Division I baseball programs in total attendance with 165,551 persons attending 41 games and 14th in average attendance with 4,038 persons per home game. In 21 of its final 23 seasons, McKethan Stadium finished in the top 15 nationally for total attendance.

The record for highest attendance in a single game at McKethan Stadium was set on April 9, 2016; a total of 6,244 spectators watched Mississippi State defeat the Gators 10-4 in the second game of a three-game series. This defeat ended the longest home winning streak in school history, a 29-game run that spanned the 2015 and 2016 campaigns. A season later, the highest total attendance record for a three-game series was made on February 26, 2017; 16,807 tickets were sold for the Gators' sweep of Miami. The best-attended two-game series in the ballpark's history was the 2015 Gainesville Super Regional, when 11,481 fans witnessed Florida sweep Florida State.

Replacement 

On October 9, 2017, the University Athletic Association submitted a project plan to the University of Florida outlining a new baseball stadium that was expected to begin construction in September 2018 and be completed by the end of 2019 with a budget of $50 million. Following delays, construction ultimately began February 2019 and concluded in August 2020, with a finished budget of approximately $65 million.

The new stadium increased available chairbacks from 2,408 to 4,000 with 700 club seats and an expandable capacity of about 10,000. The design includes a 360-degree concourse, shade canopy, and open air seated grandstand.

The new facility is located on the Southwest part of campus, adjacent to Pressly Softball Stadium and Dizney Stadium, utilizing  of land previously occupied by the University of Florida Institute of Food and Agriculture Sciences (UF/IFAS).  UF/IFAS facilities on this property were relocated to a nearby part of campus.

See also 

 Buildings at the University of Florida
 Florida Gators
 History of the University of Florida
 List of NCAA Division I baseball venues
 University Athletic Association

References

External links 

 Alfred A. McKethan Stadium – Stadium description at official website of the Florida Gators.

Baseball venues in Florida
Buildings at the University of Florida
Florida Gators baseball venues
Tourist attractions in Gainesville, Florida
1988 establishments in Florida
Sports venues completed in 1988
University and college buildings completed in 1988